Join the Q is the debut studio album from British band the Qemists. The album was released on 2 February 2009 under record label Ninja Tune.

Track listing

Personnel
The Qemists
 Dan Arnold − bass
 Leon Harris − drums
 Liam Black − guitar

Additional musicians
 Mike Patton − vocals (on "Lost Weekend")
 Jenna G − vocals (on "On the Run")
 Wiley − vocals (on "Dem Na Like Me")
 Zoe Devlin Love − vocals (on "S.W.A.G.")
 I.D. − vocals (on "Drop Audio")
 Beardyman − vocals (on "Soundface")
 MC Navigator − vocals (on "Got One Life")

References

2009 debut albums
The Qemists albums
Ninja Tune albums